Rockwell J. Flint (March 23, 1842June 23, 1933) was an American newspaper editor and Republican politician.  He served in the Wisconsin State Senate and Assembly, representing Dunn and Pepin counties.  He served as a quartermaster in the Union Army during the American Civil War and was appointed U.S. marshall for the Western District of Wisconsin by President Theodore Roosevelt.

Biography

Born in Williamstown, Orange County, Vermont, Flint moved to Wisconsin in 1855 and settled in Marquette County. In 1860, he moved to Portage and learned the printer's trade at The State Register newspaper. During the Civil War, Flint served in the 23rd Wisconsin Infantry Regiment and was a quartermaster sergeant in the United States Signal Corps. Flint moved to Menomonie, Dunn County, Wisconsin in 1871. Flint was the editor and publisher of the Dunn County News. He also published the Prescott Journal. From 1878 to 1880, Flint served as chairman of the Menomonie Town Board. In 1894 and 1895, Flint served as mayor of Menomonie and was on the Dunn County Board of Supervisors. In 1875, Flint served in the Wisconsin State Assembly as a Republican. Flint later served in the Wisconsin State Senate, being elected in 1876, 1877, 1882, and 1883. From 1908 to 1916, Flint served as United States marshal for the Western District of Wisconsin. Flint died at his home in Menomonie, Wisconsin, in 1933.

References

1842 births
1933 deaths
People from Williamstown, Vermont
People from Menomonie, Wisconsin
People of Wisconsin in the American Civil War
Union Army soldiers
Editors of Wisconsin newspapers
Mayors of places in Wisconsin
County supervisors in Wisconsin
Republican Party members of the Wisconsin State Assembly
Republican Party Wisconsin state senators
United States Marshals